In Greek mythology, the name Eurythemis (Ancient Greek: Εὐρυθέμιδος) may refer to the following women:

Eurythemis, daughter of Cleoboea. She was the wife of King Thestius of Pleuron and mother of Althaea, Leda (possibly), Hypermnestra, Iphiclus (possibly), Evippus, Plexippus and Eurypylus.
Eurythemis, daughter of Acastus, consort of Actor and mother of Ancaeus (who other sources call the son of Lycurgus).
Eurythemis, daughter of Timandreus and sister of Cotto. The two sisters were honored by the Heracleidae for having supported them in their struggle for returning to Peloponnesos.

Notes

References 

 Apollodorus, The Library with an English Translation by Sir James George Frazer, F.B.A., F.R.S. in 2 Volumes, Cambridge, MA, Harvard University Press; London, William Heinemann Ltd. 1921. ISBN 0-674-99135-4. Online version at the Perseus Digital Library. Greek text available from the same website.

Queens in Greek mythology
Aetolian characters in Greek mythology